Les Terrasses de la Chaudière is a complex of government office buildings in Gatineau, Quebec, Canada. The complex was built in 1978 as part of Prime Minister Pierre Trudeau's initiative to see more federal workers based in the Quebec side of the Ottawa River. It was built by developer Robert Campeau and then leased to the government. This arrangement caused some controversy as Campeau had close links to the governing Liberals. The complex was named after the nearby Chaudière Falls in the Ottawa River.

Today its three towers hold some 6,500 federal government office workers. The complex houses the headquarters of Crown-Indigenous Relations and Northern Affairs Canada (North Building), the headquarters of the Department of Canadian Heritage (Jules Léger Building (South)), the headquarters of the Canadian Transportation Agency (Jules Léger Building (South)), the headquarters of the Canadian Radio-television and Telecommunications Commission (CRTC)(Central Building), and other government entities. The centre also holds a shopping complex, a hotel, and a convention centre.

It is surpassed only by the Claridge Icon which stands at a height of 143 meters (469 ft).

See also

List of tallest buildings in Ottawa–Gatineau

References

External links
Emporis.com

Buildings and structures in Gatineau
Modernist architecture in Canada
Canadian federal government buildings
Government buildings completed in 1978
Office buildings completed in 1978
1978 establishments in Quebec